The fencing competitions at the 2016 Summer Olympics in Rio de Janeiro took place from 6 to 14 August at the Carioca Arena 3 inside the Barra Olympic Park in Barra da Tijuca. Around 212 fencers (an equal distribution between men and women; of which, eight fencers came from the host nation Brazil) competed in 10 events -- six individual and four team.

Similar to 2008 and 2012, the International Fencing Federation maintained the format of ten events with a rotation system for team events. As a result, the men's team sabre and the women's team foil were dropped from the program only at these Games.

Qualification

Qualification was primarily based on the FIE official rankings as of 4 April 2016, with further individual places available at four zonal qualifying tournaments.

Participating nations

Schedule

Medal summary

Medal table

Men's

Women's

See also
Wheelchair fencing at the 2016 Summer Paralympics

References

External links

 
 
 International Fencing Federation
 Results Book – Fencing

 
2016
2016 Summer Olympics events
2016 in fencing
International fencing competitions hosted by Brazil